Fideo 9 (English: Video 9) was a Welsh language television programme broadcast on S4C from 1988 to 1992. It helped launch the music careers of several Welsh singers, including Euros Childs and Gruff Rhys, and giving a platform for bands such as Y Cyrff.

The name "Fideo 9" derived from the time of its regular Thursday evening slot and its content of music videos.

The programme was presented by Eddie Ladd.

References

S4C original programming
Pop music television series
1988 British television series debuts
1992 British television series endings
1980s British music television series
1990s British music television series